Everettsville is an unincorporated community in Albemarle County, Virginia. It was named for Dr. Charles Everett who in 1821 bought the 400-acre tract called Pouncey's of the Shadwell tract from Thomas Jefferson. He more than doubled his property to more than 1,000 acres. The area became known as Everettsville.

In the mid-19th century, it was a point along the stagecoach route between Richmond and Staunton. Nicholas Trist's wife and children briefly took up residence here in early 1829 as they awaited word to follow Trist to Washington.

References

Unincorporated communities in Virginia
Unincorporated communities in Albemarle County, Virginia